The Curtiss O was a  water-cooled V-8 aero-engine, which was the basis of the commercially successful Curtiss OX series of engines.

Design and development
In 1909 Glenn Curtiss won the inaugural Gordon Bennett Trophy flying a Curtiss racing biplane powered by a V8 engine featuring a cross-flow OHV configuration (2 overhead valves, 1 rocker, 1 push-pull rod per cylinder).  At that time most of Curtiss’s competitors were using less-efficient suction intake valves.    

Curtiss continued the development of their V8 OHV engines with demand for higher power outputs being driven by the US Navy’s requirement for seaplanes.  By 1912 Curtiss V8’s were developing 75 hp at 1,100 rpm and were known as the Model O.    
  
The Model O was further developed to achieve 90 hp at 1,200 rpm at which time it was designated as the Curtiss Model OX.  Curtiss OX production started in 1913 and it became the first mass produced American aero engine series. The most successful engine in the series was the Curtiss OX-5 which powered many early American aircraft including the Curtiss Jenny, the standard trainer used by American and Canadian forces during World War One.

Applications
 Curtiss Model E-8-75 Amphibious Aircraft 
 Curtiss Model F Flying Boat. 1912 prototypes and 1913 models fitted with Curtiss "O“ engine.
 Curtiss Model G Tractor Biplane.  Two aircraft completed for the US signal corps. 1st aircraft (No.21) fitted with 75 hp Curtiss O engine driving a 3 blade propeller through a chain speed reduction system.  2nd aircraft (No 22) fitted with a 90 hp direct drive Curtiss OX engine.

Specifications

References

O
1910s aircraft piston engines